The Varanasi–Howrah High Speed Rail Corridor is a planned high-speed rail line connecting Varanasi with the city of Howrah. When completed, it will be a portion of the Delhi-Kolkata High-Speed Rail Corridor.

The project will connect the three major cities, Varanasi, Gaya and Kolkata of Eastern India. The route is set to be of 760 kilometres in length, with number of stations and cost of project yet to be finalised.

Stations
The proposed stations on this corridor are Varanasi, Sasaram, Gaya, Dhanbad, Asansol, Durgapur, Burdwan and Howrah.

Project status

2022
November: According to the report, the survey work on the corridor was completed in Bihar. The 718 km long stretch was set to be completely elevated with stations in Buxar, Patna, Gaya, Asansol, Dhanbad, Durgapur and Howrah. The preparation for land acquisition was started and the officials were awaiting for the green signal from railways to start acquiring the land and thereby starting the construction. The train would complete the journey in just over two hours with a speed of 350 kmph.

See also
 High-speed rail in India
 Chennai–Mysuru high-speed rail corridor
 Delhi–Varanasi high-speed rail corridor

References

External links
 
 

Transport in Varanasi
Rail transport in Howrah
V
Rail transport in Uttar Pradesh
Rail transport in Bihar
Rail transport in West Bengal
Rail transport in Delhi
Standard gauge railways in India